S̩ (minuscule: s̩) is a letter of the Latin alphabet, formed from S with the addition of a vertical line below it. It is used in Yoruba to represent the sound  (like English "sh").

The line is sometimes replaced by a dot, i.e. Ṣ ṣ.

 is also the International Phonetic Alphabet symbol for a syllabic "s" sound.

Computer encoding
Unicode does not include precomposed characters for S̩ s̩ — they should be represented with a combining character, which may not align properly or may display as squares in some fonts. Nevertheless, the sequence of base character + combining diacritic is given a unique name.
In Unicode:
 S̩:  + 
 s̩:  + 

Latin letters with diacritics